Live at Rio ArtRock Festival '97 is a live video by Brazilian psychedelic rock band Violeta de Outono, released by Voiceprint Records in 2015. It contains the footage of the band's performance at the Rio ArtRock Festival, in Rio de Janeiro, in 1997.

Tracks

"Astronomy Domine"
"Mulher na Montanha"
"Outro Lado"
"Dia Eterno"
"Eclipse"
"Noturno Deserto"
"Faces"
"Sombras Flutuantes"
"Declínio de Maio"
"Tomorrow Never Knows"
"Em Toda Parte"

Personnel
 Fabio Golfetti – vocals, guitar
 Cláudio Souza – drums
 Angelo Pastorello – bass

 Additional musician
 Fábio Ribeiro – keyboards

2015 video albums
Live video albums
2015 live albums
Voiceprint Records albums
Violeta de Outono albums
Portuguese-language live albums